Suzie Frankfurt (August 21, 1931 – January 7, 2005) was a prominent American interior decorator. Her popularity began in the 1950s when she designed the Young & Rubicam's lobby and when she became part of Andy Warhol's inner circle. Together she and Warhol produced a spoof of a haute cuisine cookbook. Her own decorating style, in contrast to Warhol's pop art, was traditional. Her connection with Warhol brought about client types that were both wealthy and well known in society.

Life 
After graduating with honors from Stanford University, Frankfurt moved to New York to work in the research department of the advertising agency Young & Rubicam in 1955. Here, she met her husband, Stephen Frankfurt, who was the company’s art director. Stephen also worked as a film title designer, whose most famous project was doing the titles for the film To Kill a Mockingbird. The two wed the next year and conceived two boys, later divorcing in 1968.

Work 
While at Young & Rubicam, Frankfurt was moved from the research department to the responsibility of redecorating the Young & Rubicam’s lobby and executive conference rooms. She became well known for decorating, and thirty years later she became one of the world’s most admired interior decorators. Frankfurt popularized 18th and 19th-century Russian furniture among corporate raiders of the '70s and '80s. Her client list included Robert Redford, Robert Mapplethorpe, and David L. Paul, a Florida bank chairman convicted of paying Frankfurt some $389,000 in bank funds to decorate his home. She was known for her use of Biedermeier and Russian antiques and styles, and she claims to have “made Russian chic.” Frankfurt was also known for hosting celebrity-filled cocktail parties inside her five-story, 16-room Manhattan townhouse and whose interior designs appeared frequently in Architectural Digest and the New York Times.

House 
According to Frankfurt, her own five-story Georgian town house on Seventy-third Street off Park Avenue, was her greatest creation.  Decorated with 19th-century Russian pieces, her living room included early 19th-century Austrian chairs, an 18th-century Russian sewing table, a stark needlepoint rug, and Brunschwig and Fils sofa silk.  Her house was sold to Edgar Bronfman Jr. after Frankfurt came to believe that her time in New York was up. 
She then relocated to Massachusetts where she bought a 1780s farmhouse.  The farmhouse had original pine floors, a wooden paneled living room, five bedrooms, and six fireplaces.  Her style is shown throughout the interior with warm colors, large furniture pieces, and unique elements such as her self-portrait displayed above the fireplace along with a bulky hand statue placed on her coffee table, while the exterior depicts a white, southern style house with stone walls surrounding the property.

Andy Warhol 
In addition for being known for her decorating, Frankfurt is known for her friendship and collaboration Andy Warhol. Their friendship illustrated that not all of Warhol's circle of friends were decidedly avant-garde. The two met in 1959 at the New York Plaza Hotel after one of Warhol’s art expositions in the restaurant Serendipity. They were friends for life and even collaborated in writing the book Wild Raspberries. It was a hand-written, brightly colored cookbook spoof accompanied with abstracted watercolor illustrations by Warhol.

Death
Suzie Frankfurt died on January 7, 2005, after arising complications from a brain tumor. Frankfurt is remembered for her Russian-inspired designs paired with her sophisticated and chic flair. She will also be remembered, through her relationship with Warhol, as an important individual of American history.

References

1931 births
2005 deaths
Deaths from brain cancer in the United States
American interior designers
American socialites
American women interior designers
Stanford University alumni
20th-century American women
21st-century American women